Chughanlu (also Romanized as Chūghānlū; also known as Choghānlū) is a village in Marhemetabad-e Jonubi Rural District, in the Central District of Miandoab County, West Azerbaijan Province, Iran. At the 2006 census, its population was 424, in 90 families.

References 

Populated places in Miandoab County